Clement Smith (28 June 1910 – 1970) was an English footballer who played in the Football League for Chester, Halifax Town and Stoke City

Career
Born in Wath-upon-Dearne, England Smith started his football career with South Kirkby, where his goals lead the club to the final of the Yorkshire League Cup where South Kirkby faced Halifax Town, who promptly signed him. He spent two years with the "Shaymen" before joining Chester in 1937 for £1,000. He impressed at Chester which led to Stoke City paying £2,000 for Smith's services to provide back up for Freddie Steele and George Antonio. He made 25 appearances for Stoke scoring seven goals. After the league was cancelled due to World War II Smith decided to retire from football.

Career statistics
Source:

References

English footballers
Stoke City F.C. players
Chester City F.C. players
Halifax Town A.F.C. players
South Kirkby Colliery F.C. players
English Football League players
1910 births
1970 deaths
People from Wath upon Dearne
Footballers from Yorkshire
Association football inside forwards